This is a list of the buildings, sites, districts, and objects listed on the National Register of Historic Places in the Federated States of Micronesia. There are currently 26 listed sites located in all 4 states of the Federated States of Micronesia.

Numbers of listings 
The following are approximate tallies of current listings in the Federated States on the National Register of Historic Places. These counts are based on entries in the National Register Information Database as of April 24, 2008 and new weekly listings posted since then on the National Register of Historic Places web site. There are frequent additions to the listings and occasional delistings and the counts here are not official. Also, the counts in this table exclude boundary increase and decrease listings which modify the area covered by an existing property or district and which carry a separate National Register reference number.

Kosrae

|}

Pohnpei

|}

Chuuk

|}

Yap

|}

See also

List of United States National Historic Landmarks in United States commonwealths and territories, associated states, and foreign states

References